The James Cardinal Gibbons Memorial Statue is a public artwork by Leo Lentelli, located at the Shrine of the Sacred Heart, 16th Street and Park Road Northwest, Washington, D.C.

The James Cardinal Gibbons Memorial Statue was originally surveyed as part of the Smithsonian's Save Outdoor Sculpture! survey in 1993. It was listed with the National Register of Historic Places in 2007.

Description
It is a bronze figure of James Gibbons seated, wearing cardinals robes. In his proper left hand he holds a cross which hangs from his neck. His proper right hand is raised as if giving a blessing. The base, which is made of granite and stands at H. 8 ft. x W. 10 ft., and weighs 2,500 lbs., has a relief of a shield topped with an ecclesiastical hat called a galero. The shield has the coat of arms of the Roman Catholic Archdiocese of Baltimore on the left, joined with the Cardinal's personal coat of arms on the right. Around the shield are rows of tassels that represent the ranks of clergy.  In this case, 15 rows indicate Gibbons' rank as Cardinal.

The front of the base displays:

JAMES
CARDINAL
GIBBONS
NDCCCXXXI.

The rear of the base displays:

ERECTED BY
THE KNIGHTS
OF COLUMBUS
MCMXXXII.

On the left side of the base is the artists name and the founders mark:

LEO LENTELLI Sc.
1932 ROMAN BRONZE WORKS N.Y.

Acquisition

The James Cardinal Gibbons Memorial Statue was authorized by Congress and President Calvin Coolidge on April 23, 1928. The piece was commissioned by the Knights of Columbus and cost, at no expense to the United States, $35,998. The piece was unveiled on August 14, 1932. John F. Connelly attended the dedication ceremony.

Information

The sculpture was installed to coincide with the Knights of Columbus' 50th anniversary. They chose to dedicate a sculpture on behalf of Gibbons because of his "preeminence as a great American". The sculpture was created in Lentelli's New York studio.

On February 22, 2007, the Gibbons Memorial was declared a Washington, D.C., historic site and on October 11, 2007 it was added to the national register.

References

External links

The James Cardinal Gibbons Memorial on dcMemorials.

1932 establishments in Washington, D.C.
1932 sculptures
Bronze sculptures in Washington, D.C.
Knights of Columbus
Monuments and memorials on the National Register of Historic Places in Washington, D.C.
Outdoor sculptures in Washington, D.C.
Rock Creek Park
Roman Catholic Archdiocese of Washington
Statues in Washington, D.C.